The Loyola Wolf Pack are the athletic teams representing Loyola University New Orleans in intercollegiate athletics. The Wolf Pack are a member of the National Association of Intercollegiate Athletics (NAIA), primarily competing in the Southern States Athletic Conference (SSAC) since the 2010–11 academic year. They previously competed in the Gulf Coast Athletic Conference (GCAC) from 1995–96 to 2009–10.

Loyola (La.) competes in 16 intercollegiate varsity sports: Men's sports include baseball, basketball, cross country, golf, swimming, tennis and indoor & outdoor track & field; while women's sports include basketball, cross country, golf, swimming, tennis, indoor & outdoor track & field and volleyball; and two co-ed sports were recently added, in competitive cheer and dance.

History
The intercollegiate athletics program was discontinued in 1972, but was reinstated in 1991.

Sports sponsored

Baseball
The Loyola Wolf Pack baseball team represents Loyola University New Orleans. The school's team currently competes in the Southern States Athletic Conference, which is part of the National Association of Intercollegiate Athletics. The team plays home games at 750-seat Segnette Field.

Loyola has had five Major League Baseball Draft selections since the draft began in 1965.

Men's basketball

The school's team currently competes in the Southern States Athletic Conference, which is part of the National Association of Intercollegiate Athletics. The team plays home games at the University Sports Complex.

The basketball team won the 1945 NAIA National Championship. They also made the 1946 NAIA National Semi-finals. The team made the NCAA Division I men's basketball tournament in 1954, 1957 and 1958. The team again won the NAIA championship in 2022.

Women's basketball
The school's team currently competes in the Southern States Athletic Conference, which is part of the National Association of Intercollegiate Athletics. The team plays home games at the University Sports Complex. The team has qualified for the NAIA National Tournament five consecutive seasons since 2013–14.

Men's and women's swimming
The school's teams currently competes in the Mid-South Conference, which is part of the National Association of Intercollegiate Athletics, and has been consistently ranked in the top-10 nationally since its inception in 2016. The team hosts home meets at the University Sports Complex.

Men's tennis
The Loyola Wolf Pack men's tennis team represents Loyola University New Orleans. The school's team currently competes in the Southern States Athletic Conference, which is part of the National Association of Intercollegiate Athletics. The team plays home matches at the City Park/Pepsi Tennis Center.

Women's tennis
The Loyola Wolf Pack women's tennis team represents Loyola University New Orleans. The school's team currently competes in the Southern States Athletic Conference, which is part of the National Association of Intercollegiate Athletics. The team plays home matches at the City Park/Pepsi Tennis Center.

Men's and women's track and field
The Loyola Wolf Pack men's and women's track and field teams represent Loyola University New Orleans. The school's teams currently competes in the Southern States Athletic Conference, which is part of the National Association of Intercollegiate Athletics.

Loyola runner Emmett Toppino won a gold medal at the 1932 Summer Olympics as the second leg in the 4 x 100-meter relay in which a new world record was established.

Volleyball
The Loyola Wolf Pack volleyball team represents Loyola University New Orleans. The school's team currently competes in the Southern States Athletic Conference, which is part of the National Association of Intercollegiate Athletics. The team plays home games at the University Sports Complex.

Former varsity sports

Boxing
Loyola University New Orleans formerly sponsored a boxing team. Loyola boxer Eddie Flynn won the welterweight gold medal at the 1932 Summer Olympics.

Football

Loyola University New Orleans formerly sponsored a varsity football team starting in 1921. The team was disbanded after the 1939 season for financial reasons. The team played at Loyola University Stadium.

Athletic facilities
City Park/Pepsi Tennis CenterThe City Park/Pepsi Tennis Center is a tennis facility in New Orleans, Louisiana. It is home to the Loyola Wolf Pack men's and women's tennis teams. It opened in 2011.
Lafreniere ParkLafreniere Park is the home course for the men's and women's cross country teams.
Segnette FieldSegnette Field is a baseball venue in the New Orleans metropolitan area. It is home to the Loyola Wolf Pack baseball team. The 750-seat venue opened in 2002.
University Sports ComplexThe University Sports Complex is a basketball, indoor track, swimming and volleyball facility in New Orleans, Louisiana. It is home to the Loyola Wolf Pack men's and women's basketball teams, men's and women's swimming teams and volleyball team. It opened in 1987.

References

External links